Jalong is a state constituency in Perak, Malaysia, that has been represented in the Perak State Legislative Assembly.

This constituency mandated to return a single member to the Perak State Legislative Assembly under the first past the post voting system.

Demographics

History

Polling districts 
According to the gazette issued on 31 October 2022, the Jalong constituency has a total of 12 polling districts.

Representation history

Election Results

References 

https://web.archive.org/web/20160424120924/http://www.spr.gov.my/index.php/component/content/article?layout=edit&id=74=

Perak state constituencies